Bogomir "Đakica" Rajković (born 17 July 1932), is a Serbian former professional basketball player.

Playing career 
Rajković played a point guard position. He played for Radnički Beograd prior he joined BSK (later renamed to OKK Beograd) in 1953. He played under coaches Strahinja Alagić, Borislav Stanković, and Aleksandar Nikolić until his retirement in 1966. At the time, his teammates were Radivoj Korać, Slobodan Gordić, Miodrag Nikolić, Milorad Erkić, and Trajko Rajković among others. He won two Yugoslav League championships and two Yugoslav Cups with OKK Beograd rosters.

Career achievements 
 Yugoslav League champion: 2 (with OKK Beograd: 1958, 1960).
 Yugoslav Cup winner: 2 (with OKK Beograd: 1960, 1962)

References

1932 births
Living people
BKK Radnički players
OKK Beograd players
Point guards
Serbian men's basketball players
Sportspeople from Subotica
Yugoslav men's basketball players